Horný Pial is a village and municipality in the Levice District in the Nitra Region of Slovakia.

History
In historical records the village was first mentioned in 1251.

Geography
The village lies at an altitude of 170 metres and covers an area of 6.354 km2. It has a population of about 300 people.

Ethnicity
The village is approximately 52% Magyar and 48% Slovak

Facilities
The village has a public library and a football pitch.

Genealogical resources

The records for genealogical research are available at the state archive "Statny Archiv in Nitra, Slovakia"

 Roman Catholic church records (births/marriages/deaths): 1725-1895 (parish B)
 Reformated church records (births/marriages/deaths): 1784-1898 (parish B)

See also
 List of municipalities and towns in Slovakia

External links
https://web.archive.org/web/20070513023228/http://www.statistics.sk/mosmis/eng/run.html
Surnames of living people in Horny Pial

Villages and municipalities in Levice District